Allium is a genus of monocotyledonous flowering plants with hundreds of species, including the cultivated onion, garlic, scallion, shallot, leek, and chives. The generic name Allium is the Latin word for garlic, and the type species for the genus is Allium sativum which means "cultivated garlic".

Carl Linnaeus first described the genus Allium in 1753. Some sources refer to Greek ἀλέω (aleo, to avoid) by reason of the smell of garlic. Various Allium have been cultivated from the earliest times, and about a dozen species are economically important as crops, or garden vegetables, and an increasing number of species are important as ornamental plants.

The decision to include a species in the genus Allium is taxonomically difficult, and species boundaries are unclear. Estimates of the number of species are as low as 260, and as high as 979.

Allium species occur in temperate climates of the Northern Hemisphere, except for a few species occurring in Chile (such as A. juncifolium), Brazil (A. sellovianum), and tropical Africa (A. spathaceum). They vary in height between 5 cm and 150 cm. The flowers form an umbel at the top of a leafless stalk. The bulbs vary in size between species, from small (around 2–3 mm in diameter) to rather large (8–10 cm). Some species (such as Welsh onion A. fistulosum and leeks (A. ampeloprasum)) develop thickened leaf-bases rather than forming bulbs as such.

Plants of the genus Allium produce chemical compounds, mostly derived from cysteine sulfoxides, that give them a characteristic onion or garlic taste and odor. Many are used as food plants, though not all members of the genus are equally flavorful. In most cases, both bulb and leaves are edible. The characteristic Allium flavor depends on the sulfate content of the soil the plant grows in. In the rare occurrence of sulfur-free growth conditions, all Allium species completely lose their usual pungency.

In the APG III classification system, Allium is placed in the family Amaryllidaceae, subfamily Allioideae (formerly the family Alliaceae).  In some of the older classification systems, Allium was placed in Liliaceae. Molecular phylogenetic studies have shown this circumscription of Liliaceae is not monophyletic.

Allium is one of about fifty-seven genera of flowering plants with more than 500 species. It is by far the largest genus in the Amaryllidaceae, and also in the Alliaceae in classification systems in which that family is recognized as separate.

Description

The genus Allium (alliums) is characterised by herbaceous geophyte perennials with true bulbs, some of which are borne on rhizomes, and an onion or garlic odor and flavor.

The bulbs are solitary or clustered and tunicate and the plants are perennialized by the bulbs reforming annually from the base of the old bulbs, or are produced on the ends of rhizomes or, in a few species, at the ends of stolons. A small number of species have tuberous roots. The bulbs' outer coats are commonly brown or grey, with a smooth texture, and are fibrous, or with cellular reticulation. The inner coats of the bulbs are membranous.

Many alliums have basal leaves that commonly wither away from the tips downward before or while the plants flower, but some species have persistent foliage. Plants produce from one to 12 leaves, most species having linear, channeled or flat leaf blades. The leaf blades are straight or variously coiled, but some species have broad leaves, including A. victorialis and A. tricoccum. The leaves are sessile, and very rarely narrowed into a petiole.

The flowers, which are produced on scapes are erect or in some species pendent, having six petal-like tepals produced in two whorls. The flowers have one style and six epipetalous stamens; the anthers and pollen can vary in color depending on the species. The ovaries are superior, and three-lobed with three locules.

The fruits are capsules that open longitudinally along the capsule wall between the partitions of the locule. The seeds are black, and have a rounded shape.

The terete or flattened flowering scapes are normally persistent. The inflorescences are umbels, in which the outside flowers bloom first and flowering progresses to the inside. Some species produce bulbils within the umbels, and in some species, such as Allium paradoxum, the bulbils replace some or all the flowers. The umbels are subtended by noticeable spathe bracts, which are commonly fused and normally have around three veins.

Some bulbous alliums increase by forming little bulbs or "offsets" around the old one, as well as by seed. Several species can form many bulbils in the flowerhead; in the so-called "tree onion" or Egyptian onion (A. × proliferum) the bulbils are few, but large enough to be pickled.

Many of the species of Allium have been used as food items throughout their ranges. There are several unrelated species that are somewhat similar in appearance to Alliums but are poisonous (e.g. in North America, death camas, Toxicoscordion venenosum), but none of these has the distinctive scent of onions or garlic.

Taxonomy

With over 850 species Allium is the sole genus in the Allieae, one of four tribes of subfamily Allioideae (Amaryllidaceae). New species continue to be described and Allium is one of the largest monocotyledonous genera, but the precise taxonomy of Allium is poorly understood, with incorrect descriptions being widespread. The difficulties arise from the fact that the genus displays considerable polymorphism and has adapted to a wide variety of habitats. Furthermore, traditional classifications had been based on homoplasious characteristics (the independent evolution of similar features in species of different lineages). However, the genus has been shown to be monophyletic, containing three major clades, although some proposed subgenera are not. Some progress is being made using molecular phylogenetic methods, and the internal transcribed spacer (ITS) region, including the 5.8S rDNA and the two spacers ITS1 and ITS2, is one of the more commonly used markers in the study of the differentiation of the Allium species.

Allium includes a number of taxonomic groupings previously considered separate genera (Caloscordum Herb., Milula Prain and Nectaroscordum Lindl.) Allium spicatum had been treated by many authors as Milula spicata, the only species in the monospecific genus Milula. In 2000, it was shown to be embedded in Allium.

Phylogeny

History 

When Linnaeus formerly described the genus Allium in his Species Plantarum (1753), there were thirty species with this name. He placed Allium in a grouping he referred to as Hexandria monogynia (i.e. six stamens and one pistil) containing 51 genera in all.

Subdivision 
Linnaeus originally grouped his 30 species into three alliances, e.g. Foliis caulinis planis. Since then, many attempts have been made to divide the growing number of recognised species into infrageneric subgroupings, initially as sections, and then as subgenera further divided into sections. For a brief history, see Li et al. (2010) The modern era of phylogenetic analysis dates to 1996. In 2006 Friesen, Fritsch, and Blattner described  a new classification with 15 subgenera, 56 sections, and about 780 species based on the nuclear ribosomal gene internal transcribed spacers. Some of the subgenera correspond to the once separate genera (Caloscordum, Milula, Nectaroscordum) included in the Gilliesieae. The terminology has varied with some authors subdividing subgenera into Sections and others Alliances. The term Alliance has also been used for subgroupings within species, e.g. Allium nigrum, and for subsections.

Subsequent molecular phylogenetic studies have shown the 2006 classification is a considerable improvement over previous classifications, but some of its subgenera and sections are probably not monophyletic. Meanwhile, the number of new species continued to increase, reaching 800 by 2009, and the pace of discovery has not decreased. Detailed studies have focused on a number of subgenera, including Amerallium. Amerallium is strongly supported as monophyletic. Subgenus Melanocrommyum has also been the subject of considerable study (see below), while work on subgenus Allium has focussed on section Allium, including Allium ampeloprasum, although sampling was not sufficient to test the monophyly of the section.

The major evolutionary lineages or lines correspond to the three major clades. Line one (the oldest) with three subgenera is predominantly bulbous, the second, with five subgenera and the third with seven subgenera contain both bulbous and rhizomatous taxa.

Evolutionary lines and subgenera 

The three evolutionary lineages and 15 subgenera represent the classification scheme of Friesen et al. (2006) and Li (2010). (number of sections/number of species)

 First evolutionary line
 Nectaroscordum (Lindl.) Asch. et Graebn  Type: Allium siculum (1/3) Mediterranean bells, Sicilian honey garlic
 Microscordum (Maxim.) N. Friesen Type: Allium monanthum (1/1)
 Amerallium Traub Type: Allium canadense (12/135)  
 Second evolutionary line
 Caloscordum (Herb.) R. M. Fritsch Type: Allium neriniflorum (1/3)
 Anguinum (G. Don ex Koch) N. Friesen Type: Allium victorialis (1/12)
 Porphyroprason (Ekberg) R. M. Fritsch Type: Allium oreophilum (1/1)
 Vvedenskya (Kamelin) R. M. Fritsch Type: Allium kujukense (1/1)
 Melanocrommyum (Webb et Berthel.) Rouy Type: Allium nigrum (20/160)
 Third evolutionary line
 Butomissa (Salisb.) N. Friesen Type: Allium ramosum (2/4)  fragrant garlic   
 Cyathophora R. M. Fritsch Type: Allium cyathophorum (3/5)
 Rhizirideum (G. Don ex Koch) Wendelbo s.s Type: Allium senescens (5/37)
 Allium L. Type: Allium sativum (15/300) garlic
 Reticulatobulbosa (Kamelin) N. Friesen Type: Allium lineare (5/80)
 Polyprason Radic Type: Allium moschatum (4/50)
 Cepa (Mill.) Radic ́ Type: Allium cepa (5/30) onion, garden onion, bulb onion, common onion

First evolutionary line 
Although this lineage consists of three subgenera, nearly all the species are attributed to subgenus Amerallium, the third largest subgenus of Allium. The lineage is considered to represent the most ancient line within Allium, and to be the only lineage that is purely bulbous, the other two having both bulbous and rhizomatous taxa. Within the lineage Amerallium is a sister group to the other two subgenera (Microscordum+Nectaroscordum).

Second evolutionary line 
Nearly all the species in this lineage of five subgenera are accounted for by subgenus Melanocrommyum, which is most closely associated with subgenera Vvedenskya and Porphyroprason, phylogenetically. These three genera are late-branching whereas the remaining two subgenera, Caloscordum and Anguinum, are early branching.

Third evolutionary line 

The third evolutionary line contains the greatest number of sections (seven), and also the largest subgenus of the genus Allium: subgenus Allium, which includes the type species of the genus, Allium sativum. This subgenus also contains the majority of the species in its lineage. Within the lineage, the phylogeny is complex. Two small subgenera, Butomissa and Cyathophora form a sister clade to the remaining five subgenera, with Butomissa as the first branching group. Amongst the remaining five subgenera, Rhizirideum forms a medium-sized subgenus that is the sister to the other four, larger, subgenera. This line may not be monophyletic.

Proposed infrageneric groups
Names from 
 Allium sect. Acanthoprason Wendelbo
 Allium subsect. Acuminatae Ownbey ex Traub
 Allium sect. Amerallium Traub
 Allium sect. Anguinum G. Don
 Allium sect. Brevispatha Vals.
 Allium sect. Briseis Stearn
 Allium sect. Bromatorrhiza Ekberg
 Allium sect. Caloscordum Baker
 Allium subsect. Campanulatae Ownbey ex Traub
 Allium sect. Caulorhizideum Traub
 Allium subsect. Cepa Stearn
 Allium subsect. Cernuae Rchb.
 Allium sect. Codonoprasum Ekberg
 Allium sect. Falcatifolia N. Friesen
 Allium subsect. Falcifoliae Ownbey ex Traub
 Allium sect. Halpostemon Boiss.
 Allium sect. Haneltia F.O. Khass.
 Allium sect. Lophioprason Traub.
 Allium subg. Melanocrommyon (Webb & Berthel.) Rouy
 Allium subsect. Mexicana Traub
 Allium sect. Molium G. Don ex W.D.J. Koch
 Allium sect. Multicaulea F.O. Khass. & Yengal.
 Allium sect. Oreiprason F. Herm.
 Allium sect. Petroprason F. Herm.
 Allium subg. Polyprason Radic
 Allium sect. Porrum G. Don
 Allium sect. Rhiziridium G. Don ex W.D.J. Koch
 Allium sect. Rhophetoprason Traub
 Allium subsect. Sanbornae Ownbey ex Traub
 Allium sect. Schoenoprasum Dumort.
 Allium sect. Scorodon 
 Allium sect. Unicaulea F.O. Khass.

Distribution and habitat

The majority of Allium species are native to the Northern Hemisphere, being spread throughout the holarctic region, from dry subtropics to the boreal zone, predominantly in Asia. Of the latter, 138 species occur in China, about a sixth of all Allium species, representing five subgenera. A few species are native to Africa and Central and South America. A single known exception, Allium dregeanum occurs in the Southern Hemisphere (South Africa). There are two centres of diversity, a major one from the Mediterranean Basin to Central Asia and Pakistan, while a minor one is found in western North America. The genus is especially diverse in the eastern Mediterranean.

Ecology
Species grow in various conditions from dry, well-drained mineral-based soils to moist, organic soils; most grow in sunny locations, but a number also grow in forests (e.g., A. ursinum), or even in swamps or water.

Various Allium species are used as food plants by the larvae of the leek moth and onion fly as well as some Lepidoptera including cabbage moth, common swift moth (recorded on garlic), garden dart moth, large yellow underwing moth, nutmeg moth, setaceous Hebrew character moth, turnip moth and Schinia rosea, a moth that feeds exclusively on Allium species.

Genetics
The genus Allium has very large variation between species in their genome size that is not accompanied by changes in ploidy level. This remarkable variation was noted in the discussion of the evolution of junk DNA and resulted in the Onion Test, a "reality check for anyone who thinks they have come up with a universal function for junk DNA". Genome sizes vary between 7.5 Gb in A. schoenoprasum and 30.9 Gb in A. ursinum, both of which are diploid.

Cultivation
Many Allium species have been harvested through human history, but only about a dozen are still economically important today as crops or garden vegetables.

Ornamental
Many Allium species and hybrids are cultivated as ornamentals. These include  A. cristophii and A. giganteum, which are used as border plants for their ornamental flowers, and their "architectural" qualities. Several hybrids have been bred, or selected, with rich purple flowers. A. hollandicum 'Purple Sensation' is one of the most popular and has been given an Award of Garden Merit (H4). These ornamental onions produce spherical umbels on single stalks in spring and summer, in a wide variety of sizes and colours, ranging from white (Allium 'Mont Blanc'), blue (A. caeruleum), to yellow (A. flavum) and purple (A. giganteum). By contrast, other species (such as invasive A. triquetrum and A. ursinum) can become troublesome garden weeds.

The following cultivars, of uncertain or mixed parentage, have gained the Royal Horticultural Society's Award of Garden Merit:
’Ambassador’
’Beau Regard’
’Gladiator’ 
’Globemaster’ 
'Michael H' Hoog' (A. rosenorum) 
’Round 'n' Purple’
'Universe'

Toxicity
Dogs and cats are very susceptible to poisoning after the consumption of certain species. Even cattle have suffered onion toxicosis. Vegetables of the Allium genus can cause digestive disorders for human beings.

Uses
The genus includes many economically important species. These include onions (A. cepa), French shallots (A. oschaninii), leeks (A. ampeloprasum), garlic (A. sativum), and herbs such as scallions (various Allium species) and chives (A. schoenoprasum). Some have been used as traditional medicines.

This genus also includes species that are abundantly gathered from the wild such as wild garlic (Allium ursinum) and ramps (Allium tricoccum).

References

Bibliography

Books

Chapters 
 , in

Articles 

 
 
 
 
 
 
 
 
 
 
 
 
 
 
 
  [In Chinese.]
 
 
 A. Samoylov, N. Friesen, S. Pollner, P. Hanelt. Use of chloroplast DNA polymorphisms for the phylogenetic study of Allium subgenus Amerallium and subgenus Bromatorrhiza (Alliaceae) II. Feddes Repertorium Volume 110 Issue 1–2, Pages 103–109, 1999

Websites 
 
 
 DutchGrown: Alliums
 Pacific Bulb Society: Allium
 Pacific Bulb Society: Rhizomatous Alliums

External links 
 
 Allium At:Index Nominum Genericorum At:References At:NMNH Department of Botany
 Bloomsta.com Florist Community
 Reinhard M. Fritsch. Checklist of ornamental Allium species and cultivars currently offered in the trade. 2015

 
Allium
Amaryllidaceae genera
Bulbous plants
Taxa named by Carl Linnaeus